

Incumbents
Monarch: Joseph I until 19 March, Ferdinand VII from December

Events
June 3–11 - Siege of Tarragona (1813)
June 21 - Battle of Vitoria
June 25 - Battle of Tolosa (1813)
July 25 - Battle of Roncesvalles (1813)

Births

Full date unknown
José Manuel Aguirre Miramón, jurist, politician and writer (died 1887)

Deaths

See also
Peninsular War

References

 
1810s in Spain
Years of the 19th century in Spain